Daying Ering (1929–1970) was an Indian politician from Arunachal Pradesh. He was the chairman of the Ering Commission which heavily influenced the country's panchayati raj system.

Biography 

Ering was born in an Adi family in Runne village near Pasighat in 1929. He started his career in the Indian Frontier Administrative Service. Later, in 1963, he was nominated as a Member of the Lok Sabha from NEFA by the President of India. He was later appointed as the Parliament Secretary and a Deputy Minister in the Ministry of Food and Agriculture.

In 1964, he chaired the Ering Commission, an investigative body looking into governmental decentralization. The Commission's report, in 1965, recommended a four-tier system of local government, and heavily influenced the adoption of the Panchayati Raj system.

Ering died in Shillong, in 1970. The Daying Ering Memorial Wild Life Sanctuary in the East Siang district is named after him. Other places and institutions and places named after him include the Daying Ering College of Teachers' Education, Daying Ering Memorial Middle School,Daying Ering Memorial Higher Secondary School Pasighat,Daying Ering Wildlife Foundation Eco-Development Society and Daying Ering Colony. After his death, C. C. Gohain was nominated as a Member of the Lok Sabha from NEFA by the President of India.

References

Arunachal Pradesh politicians
People from East Siang district
1929 births
1970 deaths
People from Adi Community
India MPs 1957–1962
India MPs 1962–1967
India MPs 1967–1970
Lok Sabha members from Arunachal Pradesh